Caitlin Patterson (born January 30, 1990) is an American cross-country skier. Patterson was selected and competed for the United States in the 2018 Winter Olympics in Pyeongchang, South Korea

Early life and education 
Caitlin Patterson was born in McCall, Idaho. She has one younger brother, Scott, who is also a cross-country skier. The family moved to Alaska in 2005. She attended South Anchorage High School in Anchorage, Alaska. She graduated from University of Vermont with a degree in civil engineering in 2012.

Career 
Patterson won all four national titles at the 2018 U.S. National Cross Country Championships. Patterson has been selected to compete for the United States at the 2018 Winter Olympics in Pyeongchang. Her brother Stephan was also named to the U.S. Olympic team for Pyeongchang.

Cross-country skiing results
All results are sourced from the International Ski Federation (FIS).

Olympic Games

World Championships

World Cup

Season standings

References 

1990 births
People from McCall, Idaho
American female cross-country skiers
Living people
Cross-country skiers at the 2018 Winter Olympics
Olympic cross-country skiers of the United States
University of Vermont alumni
Vermont Catamounts skiers
21st-century American women